Zagdbazaryn Davaanyam (born 15 December 1944) is a Mongolian gymnast. He competed at the 1964 Summer Olympics and the 1968 Summer Olympics.

References

1944 births
Living people
Mongolian male artistic gymnasts
Olympic gymnasts of Mongolia
Gymnasts at the 1964 Summer Olympics
Gymnasts at the 1968 Summer Olympics
Sportspeople from Ulaanbaatar